The Unstoppable Man is a 1960 British crime drama film directed by Terry Bishop and starring Cameron Mitchell, Harry H. Corbett, Marius Goring and Lois Maxwell.

Plot
A gang of criminals kidnaps the son of James Kennedy, who is an American executive of a London-based chemical company.

Kennedy ignores the advice of Inspector Hazelrigg of Scotland Yard to try a plan of his own. He doubles the ransom amount, expecting the thieves to have a falling-out over how to divide it. One is indeed killed, and evidence at the crime scene leads Kennedy to a home in Hampstead where the mastermind, Feist, is keeping Kennedy's son.

Hazelrigg comes along, but agrees to give Kennedy a few minutes to enter the house alone. Armed with a flamethrower, Kennedy is able to take his son to safety while the police close in on Feist.

Cast

 Cameron Mitchell as James Kennedy
 Marius Goring as Inspector Hazelrigg
 Harry H. Corbett as Feist
 Lois Maxwell as Helen Kennedy
 Denis Gilmore as Jimmy Kennedy
 Humphrey Lestocq as Sergeant Plummer
 Ann Sears as Pat Delaney
 Timothy Bateson as Rocky
 Kenneth Cope as Benny
 Brian Rawlinson as Moonlight Jackson
 Tony Quinn as Casey
 Tony Doonan as Alan
 Susan Denny as Milly
 Jean Marlow as May
 Edward Harvey	as Lewis
 Emrys Leyshon as Lab Assistant	
 Tony Hawes as TV Interviewer	
 Alan Edwards as Station Constable	
 John Baker as Reporter	
 Liza Page as Club Girl	
 Donald Auld as Doorman	
 Graham Stewart as Taxi Driver

Critical reception
In a contemporary review, The Monthly Film Bulletin praised the film's "sharply drawn characters", "authentic backgrounds" and "slick and resourceful" direction; and more recently, Mystery File wrote, "While there’s nothing in The Unstoppable Man that’s exceptional, that doesn’t mean that it isn’t a good — make that a very good — crime film. Running at around seventy minutes, it’s economical both on plot and the viewer’s time. But what it lacks in originality, it makes up for in atmosphere and an early 1960s jazz-influenced soundtrack that works very well."

References

External links

1960 films
1960 crime drama films
British crime drama films
Films directed by Terry Bishop
Films about child abduction
1960s English-language films
1960s British films